Aidoh is a shortening for Art In Defence Of Humanism. AIDOH was created by the Danish artist Jens Galschiot as a group focusing on the inhuman treatment of people in different countries related to political, religious or economic interests. The group has with several occasions started a public debate about the individual countries overconsumption or governments repressive treatment of its own people.

Manifests

My inner beast (1993)
Pigs in coats made of 1 ton black concrete. Is named one of the biggest art happenings in Europe. 20 sculptures were placered on public places in Europe without official approval. It took 55 hours to put the "pigs" up, and the happening created a lot of public debate.

The silent death (1995)
In connection with UN's sociale summit in Copenhagen, were there placed 750 dolls, that pictured dead children in the age of 3–9 years. They were placed on street lamps, benches, fountains and other places to symbolizes the 35.000 children's that dies every day in the world.

Pillar of Shame (1997)
Were placed in Hong Kong June 4, 1997. Since it has been placed in many other places in the world where the governments does not respect the human rights. 
The Pillar of Shame is in copper and is 8 meters tall. It consists of more than 50 tangled human bodies in pain. 
The Pillar of Shame is like a Nobel Prize in injustice.

WTO Hong Kong (2005)
Following sculptures were placed in Hong Kong at December 2005:
 Mad Cow Disease
 The survival of the fattest
 Hunger match

In the name of God (2006)
In the name of God is a number of art installations, that puts focus on Catholics prohibition against the use of condoms. It consists of a crucified pregnant teenager. It has been exhibited in Denmark, Sweden, Nicaragua and Kenya.

External links
AIDOH
Mellemfolkelig Samvirke - WTO 2005

Art movements
Human rights organizations based in Denmark